Arius was a Christian priest in Alexandria, Egypt in the early fourth century.

Arius may also refer to:

 Arius (fish), a genus of catfishes
 Arius Didymus, a citizen of Alexandria
 Hari River, a river known in Latin as the Arius
 Podocarpus costalis, species of plants native to the Philippines and Taiwan

See also
 Arian (disambiguation)
 Arianus (disambiguation)
 Arrianus (disambiguation)
 Arianism